Walgama is a village in Sri Lanka. It is located in Matara District, Southern Province.

See also
List of towns in Central Province, Sri Lanka

External links

Populated places in Central Province, Sri Lanka
Suburbs of Matara, Sri Lanka